The Sight is a 2000 American-British horror television film starring Andrew McCarthy. It was written and directed by Paul W. S. Anderson, and aired on FX in the United States on October 29, 2000.

Premise
Michael Lewis (Andrew McCarthy) is an American architect who is sent to Britain to refurbish an old London hotel, where he soon begins to have strange visions and frightening dreams.

Cast
 Andrew McCarthy as Michael Lewis
 Kevin Tighe as Jake
 Amanda Redman as Detective Pryce
 Jessica Oyelowo as Isobel

Production
The film was written and directed by Paul W. S. Anderson as a pilot for an unsold weekly TV series. It was almost entirely filmed in London.

Reception
Kevin Lyons from the website "The EOFFTV Review" gave the film a mixed review writing: "It’s not a great film by any stretch of the imagination but it’s a more restrained and thoughtful work than the brain-dead action films that Anderson was about to make his own". Lyons concluded: "It’s not the greatest ghost story ever made but it had potential and the final images suggest that the subsequent series was about to take off in more interesting directions.

References

External links
 
 

2000 television films
2000 films
2000 horror films
2000s American films
2000s British films
2000s English-language films
2000s horror thriller films
20th Century Fox Television films
American horror television films
American horror thriller films
British horror television films
British horror thriller films
Films directed by Paul W. S. Anderson
Films scored by Jocelyn Pook
Films set in hotels
Films set in London
Films shot in London
Films with screenplays by Paul W. S. Anderson
FX Networks original films
Television pilots not picked up as a series